Babacar may refer to the following people
Given name
Babacar Ba (1930–2006), Senegalese politician 
Babacar Camara (born 1981), Senegalese basketball player 
Babacar Cissé (born 1975), Senegalese basketball player 
Babacar Diallo (born 1989), Senegalese football player 
Babacar Diop (born 1993), Senegalese football player 
Babacar Gaye (born 1951), Senegalese Army General 
Babacar Gueye (born 1986), Senegalese football striker
Babacar Guèye (born 1994), French football player 
Babacar Khane (born 1935), practitioner of yoga, author, and mystical poet
Babacar M'Bengue (born 1991), German football player 
Babacar N'Diaye (born 1973), Senegalese football player 
Babacar Niang (born 1958), Senegalese-French middle-distance runner
Babacar Niang (basketball) (born 1991), French basketball player 
Babacar Sar (born 1962), Mauritanian freestyle wrestler
Babacar Sarr (born 1991), Senegalese football player 

Surname
Khouma Babacar (born 1993), Senegalese football player